Pasalimani (Pasha's harbour in Turkish) may refer to:

 Paşalimanı, a Turkish island in the Sea of Marmara
 Pashaliman Naval Base, a port and military base in Vlorë, Albania
 Harbour of Zea, known colloquially as Pasalimani, a harbor in Piraeus, Greece